From the 1930s until the 1980s, the BBC kept a number of clandestine files on applicants accused by the British Security Service (MI5, some of whose agents were stationed within the BBC) of being political subversives, in particular communists or communist sympathisers. These were marked with a distinctive upwards-facing green arrow, which bore resemblance to a Christmas tree and had the effect of blacklisting a number of applicants to BBC roles.

Knowledge of these files broke in 1985 after disclosures from The Observer newspaper; by this time, the practice had ceased, but a number of files remained. These were destroyed in the 1990s following the end of the Cold War.

Process 
From the late 1930s until 1984, the British Security Service (MI5) had an officer at the BBC vetting editorial applicants. During the Second World War, those deemed political subversives –  particularly suspected communists or fellow travellers – were banned from the BBC. The personnel records of anyone suspicious were stamped with the legend "SECRET", a distinctively shaped green upward-facing arrow or "Christmas tree"; only a handful of BBC staff knew what the tag meant. The practice was done in secret and was publicly denied until it became public knowledge when The Observer wrote on the practice in 1985. The officer in charge of vetting at this time was Ronnie Stonham.

The "Christmas tree" practice was dropped in 1984.

One reason why the Christmas tree symbol was used may have been the fact that the tune of the Christmas carol "O Tannenbaum" is the same as that of "The Red Flag", although this was coincidental; the "Christmas tree" symbols were arrows, indicating that an individual's file should be referred to a higher level.

Michael Hodder, who worked for the vetting unit in the 1980s, told The Times that all files were destroyed in the early 1990s as the Cold War ended.

Categories
 Category A: MI5 "advises that the candidate should not be employed in a post offering direct opportunity to influence broadcast material for a subversive purpose."
 Category B: MI5 "advised" against employment "unless it is decided that other considerations are overriding".
 Category C: The individual should not be debarred unless the post gave "exceptional opportunity" for subversive activity.

The BBC's policy was to not employ someone in Category A, although this did happen sometimes.

Organizations on the blacklist

The Communist Party of Great Britain
The Socialist Workers Party
The Workers Revolutionary Party
The Militant tendency
The National Front
The British National Party
Membership of these groups was not necessary for blacklisting; guilt by association was assumed.

People who underwent vetting
In 1940, Hugh Greene – who later became Director-General of the BBC – was one of the first to undergo its security vetting, as MI5 mistakenly suspected Greene was a communist. Other people who underwent vetting and gained the "Christmas tree" tag on their file included:

Anna Ford
Paul Gambaccini

John Goldschmidt
Richard Gott
Isabel Hilton
Alaric Jacob
Roland Joffé
Joan Littlewood
Ewan MacColl
Stephen Peet
Michael Rosen
Paul Turner

See also 
BBC controversies
Orwell's list
Executive Order 9835

References 

Blacklisting
MI5
Communism in England
BBC controversies